Werner Seifert (born 4 July 1949) is a Swiss businessman and the former chief executive of the German Stock Exchange.

Career

German Stock Exchange
He formed the Eurex Exchange in 1998; the UK equivalent is LIFFE (London International Financial Futures and Options Exchange). He formed the Xetra (trading system). He tried to merge the German Stock Exchange with the London Stock Exchange (LSE) in 2000, and to take it over in 2005.

Personal life
He is a musician and plays the piano. He likes British sports cars.

See also
 Clara Furse, chief executive of the London Stock Exchange from 2001–09

References

External links
 Independent profile December 2004

1949 births
Deutsche Börse
Swiss chief executives
Swiss financial businesspeople
Living people